Out of Control is the second solo studio album (his first being his 1978 self-titled) released by former Kiss drummer Peter Criss. Recording for the album began in March 1980, when Criss was still officially a member of Kiss. The album sold very poorly, and was not re-released on CD until 1997, as the Kiss reunion tour was underway.

The lone single from the album, "By Myself", failed to chart. The album features a hidden bonus track of a cover of As Time Goes By.  The album also included a cover of the song "You Better Run" by The Young Rascals.

Track listing

Personnel 
Peter Criss – lead and backing vocals, drums, percussion
Stan Penridge – guitars, backing vocals
Steve Lukather - guitars
David Wolfert – guitars, synthesizer
Tony Mercandante – bass guitar, backing vocals
Stu Woods – bass guitar
Benny Harrison – synthesizer, keyboards, backing vocals
Ed Walsh – synthesizer, synthesizer programming
Greg Zanthus Winter – synthesizer programming
David Buskin – backing vocals
George Young – saxophone on "Where Will They Run?"

Album cover 
 The album artwork was created by Todd Schorr from an idea by Criss. Criss' wife at the time, Debra Jensen, served as the inspiration for the blonde woman in the foreground, toward the left side, of the front cover.

Charts

References 

 

1980 albums
Peter Criss albums
Casablanca Records albums